The 1933–34 Lancashire Cup was the twenty-sixth occasion on which the completion had been held. Oldham won the trophy by beating St Helens Recs by 12-0.

Background 
The number of teams entering this year's competition remained at 13 and the same fixture format was retained. There was only one bye in the first round but now also a “blank” or “dummy” fixture. This also resulted in one bye in the second round.

Competition and results

Round 1  
Involved  6 matches (with one bye and one “blank” fixture) and 13 clubs

Round 2 – quarterfinals  
Involved 3 matches (with one bye) and 7 clubs

Round 3 – semifinals 
Involved 2 matches and 4 clubs

Final 

The match was played at Station Road, Pendlebury, Salford, (historically in the county of Lancashire). The attendance was 9,085 and receipts £516 (both disappointing after last year's crowd of 28,500 and gate receipts of £1,675.

Teams and scorers 

Scoring - Try = three (3) points - Goal = two (2) points - Drop goal = two (2) points

The road to success

Notes and comments 

1 * The first (and only) Lancashire Cup match to be played by London Highfield

2 * The first Lancashire Cup match at the club's new stadium

3 * Station Road was the home ground of Swinton from 1929 to 1992 and at its peak was one of the finest rugby league grounds in the country and it boasted a capacity of 60,000. The actual record attendance was for the Challenge Cup semi-final on 7 April 1951 when 44,621 watched Wigan beat Warrington 3-2

See also 
1933–34 Northern Rugby Football League season
Rugby league county cups

References

External links
Saints Heritage Society
1896–97 Northern Rugby Football Union season at wigan.rlfans.com
Hull&Proud Fixtures & Results 1896/1897
Widnes Vikings - One team, one passion Season In Review - 1896-97
The Northern Union at warringtonwolves.org

1933 in English rugby league
1933 Lancashire Cup